This is a list of settlements in Hertfordshire ordered by population based on the results of the 2001 and 2011 censuses.  In 2011 there were 35 settlements with 5,000 or more inhabitants in Hertfordshire. The next United Kingdom census will take place in 2021.

See the List of places in Hertfordshire article for an extensive list of local places and districts.

List of settlements

Notes

† - Watford count includes South Oxhey

See also

List of civil parishes in Hertfordshire
List of lost settlements in Hertfordshire
List of Sites of Special Scientific Interest in Hertfordshire
Parliamentary constituencies in Hertfordshire

References

Populated places in Hertfordshire
Hertfordshire